Eduard Gaikovich Abalov (Abalyan) (7 October 1927 – 5 August 1987) was a Soviet film actor and director.

Filmography

As director
 At a Quiet Harbor (1958) 
 At a Far Point (1970)
 Northern Rhapsody (1974)

As actor
 Clean Ponds (1965) as officer
 The Cook (1966) as scammer in the market
 The New Adventures of the Elusive Avengers (1968) as officer
 Train Stop – Two Minutes (1972) as train passenger
 Northern Rhapsody (1974) as Gurgen Khachaturovich
 The Twelve Chairs (1976) as barbeque chef

References

External links
 

1927 births
1987 deaths
Soviet film directors
Soviet male film actors
Gerasimov Institute of Cinematography alumni
Soviet emigrants to Canada
Soviet Armenians
Film people from Tbilisi